The International School Eindhoven (ISE), formerly the International Secondary School of Eindhoven (ISSE), is an international school situated in the  northern part of Eindhoven.

The current school (ISE) has merged itself with the primary division (RIS), therefore coming under one branch the ISE (International School Eindhoven). As of September 2013, the ISE is located on a new campus. The school is located towards the outskirts of Eindhoven, close to the Eindhoven Airport. The campus is based on a former military base, De Constant Rebecque Kazerne. The school has arranged bus services via Hermes  for students to travel from the city center to the campus.

Information

The International Secondary School Eindhoven is an English-based International School in Eindhoven, Netherlands, open to students across the age-range 11 to 19. It is accredited by the Council of International Schools and the New England Association of Schools and Colleges. It currently has 400 students enrolled, coming from over 30 nationalities worldwide.

History

ISE traces its history to the Philips International School, founded in 1965 for primary education, and to a Philips-led initiative to deliver core secondary education in English-medium at a pre-existing school from 1974. The first school features in Episode 9 of the 1977 BBC series The Age of Uncertainty, in which honoured economist John Kenneth Galbraith describes it as a product of corporate power designed to protect the dominant institution of its society, noting "English is to the modern corporation as Latin was to the medieval church".

The Philips International School renamed Regional International School (RIS) in 1975, subsequently adding other language streams such as French and German. In contrast, leaders of the secondary education expanded the scope of English lessons and relocated to form a semi-autonomous International Secondary School Eindhoven (ISSE) in 1986. In 2001 the ISSE moved again to a site 30% larger at Venetiestraat 43, Eindhoven.

Since 1982 the school has provided education up to International Baccalaureate's Diploma Programme. A successful RIS-ISSE merger started in 2007 and concluded in 2012 with current ISE branding.

Curriculum

The ISE offers the International Baccalaureate's Middle Years Programme (MYP) and the Diploma Programme (DP). There are five year groups in the Middle Years Programme and two years in Diploma Programme. English is the main language used throughout the school.

As part of the MYP, students are required to follow the curriculum set out by the International Baccalaureate. The five areas of interaction of the MYP are the students’ main focus for all students, and students have to fulfil a community and service programme as part of the curriculum. In the fifth year of the MYP, students are asked to complete 50 hours of community and service as a compulsory subject in order to acquire a certificate, as well as the completion of a Personal Project

In the DP years, Theory of Knowledge (TOK), Creativity, Action, Service (CAS) and Extended Essay (EE) are the critical areas which the students must focus on.

Although the main language used within the school is English, the school also offers Spanish and French as secondary languages within the MYP years. Dutch is a compulsory subject, and is offered at three levels: Foundation, Secondary Language and Primary Language. Later on in the Diploma Programme, students may choose other languages as their primary language instead of English.

If students have little experience with English, they may participate in an English Language Learning (ELL) course, which aims to improve the student’s knowledge of English to a level that is sufficient to allow the student to be able to communicate in other classes. During the time a student is in the ELL, he/she may be withdrawn from regular classes to focus on improving his/her English skills.

The ISE offers two artistic courses in the MYP years: Performing Arts/Music Classes and Visual Arts. Later on in the DP, only the Visual Arts course is offered.

Physical Exercise is compulsory for all students.

Extracurricular activities

An annual Ski Trip to Austria or Switzerland is available to all students during "Activities Week". Students also get the opportunity to go to London for the London Trip.  Furthermore, the school also engages in class trips for each individual grade, usually at the beginning of the year. These trips are adventure camps designed to encourage team building and other social skills between staff and students.

After school activities include Football or creative writing clubs. The extra curricular sports activities and regular participation in sports tournaments have gained the school a good reputation in Basketball, Softball, Football and Volleyball. It also enters NECIS tournaments on all four categories on an annual basis.

Different Workshops for parents are offered in the ISE community and take place on the ISE campus. 

The ISE has participated in the Model United Nations (MUN) since the 1980s, and has won the "Best Delegation Award" on many occasions. The school is also involved with two MUN conferences: Model United Nations International School of The Hague (MUNISH) and The Hague International Model United Nations (THIMUN).

Facilities
The area of the entire site is around 17,000m2 with a spacious outdoor recreational area which includes two basketball courts, an open grass field and a football field. The area within the building has around 7,000m2 of floor space. It features 30 classrooms, of which four are science and experimental laboratories, two are visual arts workrooms, and one a design technology workroom. There are also two computer laboratories and one music room. A large multi-purpose hall including a canteen is present which can be transformed into a theatrical stage for performances or special events. The building also features a library with a multimedia centre as well as a two full-sized gym halls.

The International School of Eindhoven
Discussions on merging the International Secondary School of Eindhoven and the Regional International School have dated back since 2006. Currently, the primary department is in a separate building from the secondary department. The confirmation of the merger in 2009 announced that the new school shall merge both the secondary department and the primary department under the name International School of Eindhoven. The merging process was completed in 2013 when both the RIS and the ISSE moved to the oirschotsedijk.

References

External links

http://www.facebook.com/iseindhovencampus 
http://www.instagram.com/isecampus
The ISSE in the International Baccalaureate website

International Baccalaureate schools in the Netherlands
International schools in the Netherlands
Schools in Eindhoven